Jan Havel (born July 8, 1996) is a Czech professional ice hockey player. He is currently playing for HC Sparta Praha of the Czech Extraliga.

Havel made his Czech Extraliga debut playing with HC Sparta Praha during the 2015-16 Czech Extraliga season.

References

External links

1996 births
Living people
HC Sparta Praha players
Czech ice hockey right wingers